The third season of the Greek reality show Just the 2 of Us began airing on March 14, 2020 for the first time from Open TV.

The main host for season three was Nikos Koklonis and the backstage host was Vicky Kavoura. Despina Vandi, Maria Bakodimou, Stamatis Fasoulis and Vicky Stavropoulou were in the judging panel.

It was revealed that season three would have 14 contestants, the biggest number of participants so far.

Due to the COVID-19 pandemic in Greece, all shows aired without the audience in the studio to respects the governmental procedures imposed. On March 17, 2020, the channel Open TV announced that the production would be interrupted due to the COVID-19 pandemic in Greece. On April 29, 2020, Open TV announced that the show will return on May 2, 2020. The show returned again without audience in the studio. The contestants stayed in the chairs, where the audience sit. Among the judges was a mosque.

The show until the 10th episode was filmed 4 days before the episodes were aired on television, but the semifinal and the final were broadcast Live.

On July 11, 2020, Tasos Xiarchos and Connie Metaxa were declared the winners. Vicky Hadjivassiliou and Costas Karafotis came in second place, with Trifonas Samaras and Chara Verra came in third place.

Format
Fourteen professional singers and fourteen personalities from various venues who have the courage to sing on stage join their voices in a charity music show.

Each week, the duets will fill the stage of Just the 2 of Us with unique performances.

The jury will evaluate the contestants' duets each week and they will also vote for them, from 1 to 10.

Viewers will get 5 votes through the OPEN app and for three days after each show they will be able to vote for their favorite duo for free. Based on this vote, the most popular duo will secure immunity in the next episode. The couple with the fewest judges votes and viewers votes will be eliminated from the show.

The 28 contestants will be tested in a rich and unpredictable Greek and foreign repertoire to highlight the winner.

Judges
Despina Vandi, singer, actress.
Maria Bakodimou, television presenter.
Stamatis Fasoulis, actor.
Vicky Stavropoulou, actress.

Couples

Scoring chart

Red numbers indicate the lowest score for each week
Green numbers indicate the highest score for each week
 the couple eliminated that week
 the returning couple finishing in the bottom two/three
 indicates the couple which was immune from elimination
 the winning couple
 the runner-up couple
 the third-place couple

Average score chart 
This table only counts for performances scored on a traditional 40-points scale.

Weekly scores

Week 1
The premiere aired on March 14, 2020. Errika & Aris had the highest combined score from judges and they got immunity and for next week.

Week 2
Errika & Aris had immunity from the previous episode.

Week 3

Week 4

Week 5

Week 6
On May 22, 2020, Aspa Tsina announced on her Facebook account that she leaves the show, because of health reasons. The new partner of Marios Priamos Ioannidis was George Lebanis, who was eliminated last week with Christina Vrachali.

Week 7
Musical guest: Angela Dimitriou

Week 8

Week 9: Greek Night
Musical guest: Snik

Week 10: Cinema night

Week 11: Live Semi-final

Week 12: Live Final

Ratings

References

External links
 Official website of Just the 2 of Us

2020 Greek television seasons
Television productions suspended due to the COVID-19 pandemic